Motion Sickness may refer to:

Motion sickness, nausea caused by motion or perceived motion
Motion Sickness (album), a 2005 live album by Bright Eyes
"Motion Sickness" (Bright Eyes song), a 2000 single by Bright Eyes
"Motion Sickness" (Phoebe Bridgers song), a 2017 song by Phoebe Bridgers